Priscilla Gneto (born 3 August 1991) is a French judoka, Olympic bronze medalist at the London 2012 Summer Olympics.

On 12 November 2022 she won a gold medal at the 2022 European Mixed Team Judo Championships as part of team France.

References

External links

 
 
 
 
 

Living people
1991 births
Sportspeople from Abidjan
French female judoka
Ivorian emigrants to France
Olympic judoka of France
Judoka at the 2012 Summer Olympics
Judoka at the 2016 Summer Olympics
Olympic bronze medalists for France
Olympic medalists in judo
Medalists at the 2012 Summer Olympics
Competitors at the 2018 Mediterranean Games
Mediterranean Games bronze medalists for France
Knights of the Ordre national du Mérite
Mediterranean Games medalists in judo
Judoka at the 2019 European Games
European Games medalists in judo
European Games bronze medalists for France